GURPS Infinite Worlds is a supplement for the Fourth Edition of the GURPS role-playing game, published by Steve Jackson Games in 2005 and written by Kenneth Hite, Steve Jackson, and John M. Ford. It expands upon the campaign setting of conflict between the Infinity Patrol, which is the dimension-jumping agency on "our" Earth, referred to as Homeline, and Centrum across a multiplicity of alternate history Earths. This was presented in the Fourth Edition GURPS Basic Set (and originated in the Third Edition supplements GURPS Time Travel, GURPS Alternate Earths, and GURPS Alternate Earths II).

Contents
GURPS Infinite Worlds builds on the idea of player characters travelling from one world to another, even across genres, for the fourth edition of GURPS.

GURPS Infinite Worlds has eight chapters:  Infinity Unlimited, Enemies Everywhen, Present at the Creation, Worlds Enough, ...And Time, Infinite characters,  Infinite Campaigns, and Alternate Infinities.

Infinity Unlimited
This chapter describes one of the two worlds (known locally as Homeline) that have full-fledged, public "parachronics" programs (the technology behind traveling between parallel universes). Travel between worlds is generally done through ground-based equipment ("projectors") or vehicles ("conveyors"), but magic, parahuman abilities and even stranger methods can and have been utilized by both. Alternate worlds (also known as realities or worldlines) are grouped into "quanta", which have varying degrees of ease of access not only to Homeline but to her opponents.

Enemies Everywhen
This is the chapter that describes Homeline's adversaries and hazards.  The major adversary is Centrum, the only other reality known to have a public parachronics program, who can be played as a deadly adversary, occasional opponents or grudging allies depending on the GM's preference.

The secondary adversary is Reich-5, the worst of the five known 'Nazis win/survive WWII' realities in the setting. An ill-advised raid by Spetsnaz troops from Homeline Russia resulted in the capture of a troop conveyor, a handful of live prisoners, and the corpse of a scout with a genetically-linked psionic world-jumping ability. A quick-thinking local Brigadeführer made a deal with the mystical SS society of the Ahnenerbe to take possession of the booty (and to keep it all secret from the mainstream Nazi hierarchy); Reich-5 scientists and sorcerers are using occult rituals and horrific medical experiments to slowly spread their Thousand Year Reich to other realities.

Present at the Creation
This chapter describes how to create your own alternate reality and offering inspirational concepts to look at such as the Great Man, Great Moment, and Great Motherland.

Worlds Enough

This is the chapter on some of the alternate worlds in the setting.  Reich-5, Caliph, Dixie, Ezcalli, Gernsback, Roma Aeterna, and Shikaku-Mon all appeared in slightly different forms in the older Alternate Earths volumes.

Armada-2

So named because it is the second world discovered by the Infinity Patrol in which the Spanish Armada was victorious over the English in 1588, Armada-2 is a world just now (in "current year" 1812) emerging from the shadow of Catholic Spanish hegemony, with Sweden, an industrialised Egypt and Huguenot Nouvelle France as other powers.

Attila
A parallel where city-razing Mongol hordes under Genghis Khan destroyed first Beijing and then all the cities of Europe, where now their descendants (in "current year" 2004) rule an entirely nomadic continent. The world was mistakenly named for Attila the Hun by early Infinity Patrol researchers who were confused as to which nomadic leader was responsible for the destruction. Meanwhile, Japan trades across the Pacific Ocean with the urbanized tribes of North and South America, and city-states dot Africa, where steam engines have just been developed.

Azoth-7
When Isaac Newton discovered the secret of the philosopher's stone in 1693, he paved the way for an Alchemical Revolution that has left Azoth-7 dominated by the magical might of Britain, Venice, Prussia, and Spain by "current year" 1780.  Notable for having space travel - though whatever Polaris and Sirius may be, they are not balls of hydrogen tens or hundreds of light-years away from Earth. (The Rivers of London series is also based on the premise of a magical Isaac Newton)

Bonaparte-4
In Bonaparte-4, Napoleon sacrificed the romance of an Egyptian campaign (which he conducted in 1798 in our timeline) for a stealthy invasion of Ireland, granting him victory over Britain. By "current year" 2024, the world is divided between French, Japanese, Russian, and Brazilian Empires, along with the United States and the Russian Republic, and the world has achieved a stage of technological achievement and social disaffection and tension reminiscent of cyberpunk.

Britannica-3
The success of the rebellion of James, Duke of Monmouth against James II of England in 1685 is the point of divergence between our own world and Britannica-3; wiser and more Protestant rule in Britain meant that tensions with the North American colonies never reached the point of rebellion as they did in real history. Despite the rise of other strong European powers, the world is free of major conflicts, which can be attributed to the strong influence of Centrum in this parallel.

Caliph
In this world the printing press was invented in Baghdad in 796 and was shortly followed by the widespread adoption of the scientific method and an oil-based industrial revolution. The current year here is 1684, but the technological acceleration stemming from these changes has resulted in a society seemingly centuries ahead of Homeline. Unfortunately a burgeoning global war between the tradition-minded major states (Sofala, Persia, Andalus, the Bulgarian Caliphate and the Ummah) and the technocratic Jamahiriya of the western continents threatens the existence of this advanced society.

Campbell
Named for the early death of influential science fiction editor John W. Campbell which occurred in this parallel but not in real history, Campbell is a world notable for the poverty of its scientific advancement. While military applications of scientific research advanced rapidly enough, science as an intellectual pursuit became associated exclusively with death, destruction, and catastrophe (especially after World War II ended with the bombardment of Germany with radioactive dust, killing hundreds of thousands of people). This led to an anti-scientific wave of pacifist Luddism and charismatic religious revival in the 1960s. Lacking the positive fruits of scientific inquiry, the world heads (in "current year" 2004) through ecological disaster and failing economies to a nigh-inevitable showdown between its capitalist and communist societies.

Centrum
The nominal villains of the campaign, Centrum is a totalitarian, homogenized world-state, and the only world other than Homeline to have a major parachronic program. Its point of departure was in 1120, when the White Ship carrying William the Aetheling, the heir of Henry I of England, did not hit a rock in the English Channel. William's survival precluded The Anarchy and the Hundred Years War, and ultimately the "Anglo-French Empire" became a world-spanning power, with technological progress centuries beyond that of Homeline.

However unbearable tensions existed just below the surface, and in 1902 unknown parties decapitated the ruling house by detonating a nuclear device in London. The resulting succession wars included nuclear and biological weapons, wiped out much of humanity and reduced most of the survivors to preindustrial barbarism. But Terraustralis (Homeline Australia) escaped much of the destruction, and the techno-military cabal known as "The Centrum" that took control there ultimately extended its authority across the globe.

Centrum is a socialist technocratic meritocracy; the government provides all employment and handles the economy, which is bolstered by the massive resources acquired from other worldlines. They believe other worlds should be aiming to follow their example and have a dedicated program of supporting political and economic groups that reflect their own values—stability, meritocracy and an unconscious prejudice against non-English speakers. They view the mix of competing government agencies and private companies from Homeline as dangerously reminiscent of the period prior to their own "Final War".

Centrum Beta
One of the most important parallel Earths from the Infinity Patrol's point of view, Centrum Beta appears to be an exact copy of the home parallel of Centrum - except that the "current year" is only 1895. Understanding Centrum Beta as it is now might give the Infinity Patrol the key to understanding and besting Centrum proper.

Deadly Settings
Also known generally as "Reality Vanish", there are at least 41 parachronic coordinate settings where people or objects sent into them never return. These are assumed to be worlds where the laws of physics are sufficiently different from that of our own universe to kill visitors and/or cripple their equipment (see Rustic under Puzzle Worlds, below).

Dixie-1
In this world, William Walker succeeded in conquering Nicaragua in 1856; during the American Civil War this provided a way around the Union blockade for the Confederacy that ultimately ensured their victory. In revenge for British support of the rebels, the United States invaded and annexed most of Canada; meanwhile the Southrons reintroduced their "peculiar institution" into Central America and the Caribbean at gunpoint. Today ("current year" 1993) the U.S.A. and C.S.A. watch each other warily across an armed border that stretches to the Pacific, while India, the Chinese republics and their neighbors expand their economies at the expense of the moribund European monarchies that never fell after 1918. (See American Civil War alternate histories).

Ezcalli
Here the Columbian Exchange occurred two thousand years early, when a Carthaginian fleet was blown across the Atlantic to discover the New World. This premature contact gave the Native American civilizations time to recover from the shock of new diseases and adopt the newcomers' technology; in addition, the early introduction of maize and the potato to the Old World eventually reduced Rome's ability to control its subjects through Egyptian grain. The Empire ended with Nero, and the patchwork of European successor states were ill-equipped to resist subsequent barbarian invasions. In the "current year" of 1848, the expansionist, steam-powered Tenochca Empire faces off against the Hotinohsavannih League to the north and the Songhay Empire (the last remnant of Roman culture) to the east; whoever wins is likely fated to take on the somnolent but fearsomely large Mongol Khaganate that covers most of Eurasia.

Friedrich
This parallel world is named for the Holy Roman Emperor Friedrich I Barbarossa, who in this timeline managed to be the great imperial unifier and conqueror that the vagaries of fortune prevented him from being in our history. In "current year" 1219, seventeen years after his death, Friedrich is notable for being a hotbed of activity by the SS Raven Division from the Nazi-dominated parallel Reich-5, who seek to turn his Holy Roman Empire into a First Reich and breeding ground for Aryan warriors.

Gallatin
Gallatin is named for Albert Gallatin, the dominant member of Thomas Jefferson's government due to Alexander Hamilton having died in the Battle of Trenton. Without Hamilton to defend and explain the United States Constitution in the Federalist Papers, it was never ratified and the independent colonies balkanized into nine separate republics across the continent by 1860. In "current year" 2004, Gallatin's great powers include Texas (whose nuclear arsenal shields the other libertarian American republics), German-dominated Europaverein, the British Empire, the Soviet Union, and the Japanese Empire; peace is maintained by the fear of mutual destruction in an atomic war.

Gernsback
This parallel world is named after editor Hugo Gernsback, due to the futuristic architecture and technology being used there. The divergence happened in 1893, when Nikola Tesla married Anne Morgan, daughter of millionaire and philanthropist J. P. Morgan, an event that helped him to stabilize his life and make many of his inventions reality thanks to the support of his father-in-law. In 1902, he created a radio tower that broadcast to the entire world from Long Island, and he later managed to develop wireless electricity broadcasting, which eventually helped Germany to stabilize and avoid falling under the control of Adolf Hitler and Nazism, and strengthening the League of Nations, avoiding World War II. When, in 1951, Andrei Sakharov managed to defect to the West and tell of Stalin's plans to create atomic weapons, the League of Nations declared war on the Soviet Union, which fell on April 30, 1953, with the death of Joseph Stalin. In "current year" 1965, the World Science Council and the League of Nations are putting down all threats to the techno-utopia that has resulted from the inventions derived from Tesla's work. However, this is a world where race and sex discrimination still run rampant. The main mission of the I-Cops in here is to prevent Centrum from taking over, as Centrum regards Gernsback as a potential ally.

Hell Worlds
Many timelines have suffered catastrophes (some natural, others man-made) that have rendered humanity either extinct or nearly so. These are colloquially known as the "hell worlds". Examples include Ariane (where the Spanish flu killed 99.9% of the population), Lenin-2 (where nuclear war and unconstrained industry have combined to crash the biosphere) and the worrisome Gotha parallels (where a prion-based disease has turned almost all humans into bloodthirsty cannibals on 19 otherwise dissimilar worlds).

Homeline
The main world in the game. The world of "our" timeline (apart from the development of parachronics) and home base of Infinity Patrol, and of players in the game. Seeks to counteract Centrum and its efforts to interfere with natural development of alternate worlds.

Lenin-1
Here Franklin D. Roosevelt maintained Henry A. Wallace as his vice president when he was reelected in 1944; consequently Wallace became president on April 12, 1945 upon Roosevelt's death. His passive stance (and that of his successors) against the Soviet Union resulted in the steady expansion of Communism across the globe. In the "current year" of 1989, the isolated and malaise-stricken United States is essentially the sole remaining capitalist country on the planet.

Merlin-1
Named after the wizard of that name, Merlin-1 is a world where magic entered the world due to the Trinity nuclear test in August 1945. In "current year" 2004 America (where much of the magic is centred) uses both magic and technology to be the dominant superpower. Homeline has begun investigating this world to obtain information about this mana-rich reality, but unbeknownst to them the Merlin-1 American government is aware of their actions and has begun spying on them in return. The setting of GURPS Technomancer.

Merlin-3
A world where magic entered the world in 1916, and is centered in Germany. In "current year" 1942, World War II is being fought with magic. The setting of GURPS WWII: Weird War II.

Myth Parallels
Many worlds have inhabitants that closely resemble characters from the myths, legends and stories of Homeline. The characters from the Arabian Nights stories, three different King Arthurs (Riothamus, the Vulgate Cycle Arthur, and Thomas Malory's version) and Sherlock Holmes are all represented by various worlds, along with hundreds of others.

Nergal
Shalmaneser III of Assyria wiped out Jerusalem and Tyre in this world in 854 B.C., and his successors destroyed the Greek city-states a century later. In the "current year" of 1678, various empires based on slavery and human sacrifice cover the globe (except for an Infinity Patrol-supported haven in southern Africa) while an anomalous ice age threatens to wipe out those unfortunate to live in a world where monotheism, democracy and the Greek and Latin alphabets were destroyed almost before they could begin.

Puzzle Worlds
Some worlds that do not follow the generally accepted laws of physics in one way or another or otherwise demonstrate unusual characteristics—it is important to note that in the Infinite Worlds setting, most magic fits under the category of "accepted laws of physics". Rustic (where artificial electric discharges are impossible to generate), Enigma (where the entire population of the world disappeared on July 12, 1982) and Blip (where one day spent there is equal to a little over six minutes on other worlds) are some examples.

Reich-5
Widely regarded as one of the most disturbing and potentially dangerous worlds so far discovered, in this parallel Giuseppe Zangara succeeded in assassinating Franklin Delano Roosevelt in 1933. His successors Garner, Lindbergh and Wallace proved unable to handle the Great Depression, and America stood by while Hitler conquered Europe and Japan took over most of Asia. In 1944, Japan attacked Guam, the Philippines and Hawaii; in the ensuing chaos William Dudley Pelley was elected president. Pelley quickly assumed dictatorial powers, and his blatant theft of the 1948 election from Robert A. Taft triggered wholesale civil war. The president called for aid from Nazi Germany, which quickly sent 40 Wehrmacht divisions through Canada. The pro-democracy resistance collapsed after Werner Heisenberg developed the atomic bomb which was used on four American cities in 1950. A second attempt at rebellion in 1976 failed, and America is now a (very) junior partner of the World-Axis that dominates the planet. Reich-5's technology (military or otherwise) is superior to that of any Homeline country, and despite being the only known timeline besides Homeline and Centrum to possess world-jumping technology, their parachronic program is well behind those of the other two.

Roma Æterna
Here Nero Claudius Drusus did not die in 9 B.C. In turn, he became the successor to Augustus instead of Tiberius. The imperial line that followed was so successful that when the First Empire fell apart in the 5th century the guiding ideals of Rome were never discarded and were ultimately restored. After the Mongol invasions broke the Second Empire in the 14th century, colonies in the Hesperides preserved these ideals in turn and ultimately re-restored the empire in the late 18th century. The "current year" is 1893, and the Musket-wielding legions of the Third Empire are found from the Magna Campania to the Ganges, with no sign of retreating anytime soon. The only other significant political entities in the world are Serica (China) and its North American kingdom Fu-Sang (centered on San Francisco), Taehan (a growing empire based on the Korean Peninsula), and the isolationist South American kingdom of Huaraca.

Shikaku-Mon
In this "four-cornered world" Juan, Prince of Asturias, the son of King Ferdinand II and Queen Isabella of Spain survived to take the Spanish throne as King John III. The resulting changes in history spread all the way to Japan, where an increased Jesuit presence prolonged the life of Oda Nobunaga and prevented the closing of the country by the Tokugawa shogunate. In the resulting cyberpunk "current year" of 2027, the dominant powers include a Japanese Empire that covers China, India, New Zealand, and much of East Asia, the economic superpower of Brazil, the totalitarian Swedish Empire and the technologically advanced Kingdom of France.

United States of Lizardia
A world very similar to our own, except reptilian creatures descended from a species of Troodon are the dominant sentient lifeform. The similarities exist down to cultural and political divisions (resulting in this world's colloquial name) and are assumed by Homeline scientists to be evidence of a "law of temporal inertia" (or "gods with a strange sense of humour").

Yrth
A world reminiscent of several fantasy tropes, inhabited by humans, dwarves, elves etc., all of whom have been involuntarily taken from other worldlines. The setting of GURPS Banestorm.

... And Time
This chapter deals with the many theories of Temporal Physics both real and fictional that exist.

 Paradoxes (Assumes Fixed Time with one past, present, and future.)
The Grandfather Paradox
The Free Lunch Paradox (also known as the Ontological paradox The example is taken from The Eyre Affair and has the time traveler give Shakespeare a book detailing his plays which Shakespeare copies.  The result is no one actually writes the plays!)
 Plastic Time (past can be changed but there are dangers to doing so)
Traveler at Risk (Example: Back to the Future)
World at Risk (Examples: Back to the Future II, and New Twilight Zone Episode "Portrait in Silver")
Past or Traveler at Risk (Combines Traveler at Risk and World at Risk)
Returned Blocked
 Chaotic Time (extreme version of Plastic Time where small changes can result in big alterations. Example: short story "A Sound of Thunder")
 Plastic Time with High Resistance (It is very hard to change history and the larger the event the more difficult it is to change. Examples:  Twilight Zone episode "Back There", The Time Machine (2002 film)
 Paradox-Proof Time (Extreme version of Fixed Time where the past cannot be changed and any attempt to do so snaps you back to your present.)
 New Timelines
 Parallel Worlds (Time travel is really parallel universe travel. Examples: Timeline (novel), James P. Hogan's The Proteus Operation and the Parallels (Star Trek: The Next Generation) episode all use the Parallel Worlds mechanic for alternate timelines (Data calls them Quantum Realities).

There are some other ideas provided to make things either easier or more difficult for your intrepid travelers such as Linearity Principle, Oscillating Time, Recency Effect, and Temporal Exclusion as well how communication works.

Infinite Characters
Special notes on certain rules in the setting and character templates.

Infinite Campaigns
Designing the campaign's scope and direction.

Alternate Infinities
This chapter provides alternatives to the "default" Infinity setting.
 The Order of the Hourglass - psychic time travel
 The Time Corps - a setting similar to that of Pacesetter's Time Master series where the player's homeworld is battling against an alternate timeline (called Stopwatch) with access to the past as the prize.
 The Horatio Club - a house whose doors open on to other times and other histories.

Publication history
GURPS Infinite Worlds was designed by Kenneth Hite, Steve Jackson, and John M. Ford, and published by Steve Jackson Games in 2005.

Reception
GURPS Infinite Worlds won the 2005 Origins Award as Best Game Supplement.

See also 
List of GURPS books
List of campaign settings

References

Alternate history role-playing games
GURPS 4th edition
Infinite Worlds
Infinite Worlds
Origins Award winners
Parallel universes in fiction
Role-playing game supplements introduced in 2005
Time travel and multiple reality role-playing games
Works by John M. Ford